The Neptune Fountain in Berlin was built in 1891 and was designed by Reinhold Begas. The Roman god Neptune is in the center. The four women around him represent the four main rivers of Prussia at the time the fountain was constructed: the Elbe (with the allegorical figure holding fruits and ears of corn), Rhine (fishnet and grapes), Vistula (wooden blocks, symbols of forestry), and Oder (goats and animal skins). The Vistula is now entirely in Poland, while the Oder forms the border between Germany and Poland.

The fountain was removed from its original location at the Schlossplatz in 1951, when the former Berliner Stadtschloss (Berlin City Palace) there was demolished. Eventually, after being restored, the fountain was moved in 1969 to its present location between the St Mary's Church and the Rotes Rathaus.

The diameter is 18 m (59 ft), the height is 10 m (33 ft).

There was another well-known Neptunbrunnen in Breslau (nicknamed "Gabeljürge" or "Georgie Fork" by the locals), but it was destroyed during World War II and the city was later transferred to Poland.

Events
In 2013, a member of the Berlin Police Force shot an armed man before the fountain. The 31-year-old man was nude, holding a knife, and was believed to be mentally disturbed.

References

External links

 

1891 sculptures
Allegorical sculptures in Germany
Buildings and structures in Berlin
Fountains in Germany
Outdoor sculptures in Berlin
Sculptures of men in Germany
Sculptures of Neptune
Sculptures of women in Germany
Statues in Germany
Personifications of rivers